Lurlene McDaniel (born 1944 in Philadelphia, Pennsylvania) is an American author who has written more than 70 young adult books. She is well known for writing about young adults struggling with mortality and chronic illness, a career that began as a therapeutic way to deal with the trauma when her son, then 3, was diagnosed with juvenile diabetes.  Her characters have grappled with cancer, diabetes, organ failure, and the deaths of loved ones through disease or suicide. She is a graduate of the University of South Florida - Tampa and currently resides in Chattanooga, Tennessee.

Research
To make her novels medically accurate, she interviews health professionals and works with various medical groups including hospices. She also studies the Bible to help infuse her work with "the human element—the values and ethics often overlooked by the coldness of technology."

Other types of work
In addition to her young adult catalog and a magazine column, she has also written for radio, television and marketing campaigns.
She is a frequent guest speaker, seen everywhere from schools to conventions.

Partial bibliography

Novels
 For Better, For Worse, Forever
 Heart to Heart
 I’m a Cover Girl Now
 More than Just a Smart Girl
 Mother, Please Don’t Die
 Why Did She Have To Die (rereleased in 2001)
 The End of Forever
 What’s It Like to Be a Star?
 Where’s the Horse for Me / Three’s a Crowd
 Always and Forever
 Briana’s Gift
 If I Should Die Before I Wake
 Last dance
 Letting Go of Lisa
 Angel of Hope
 Sometimes Love isn't Enough (1984)
 Too Young to Die (August 1989)
 Goodbye Doesn't Mean Forever (August 1989)
 Somewhere Between Life and Death (1990)
 Time to Let Go (1990)
 Now I Lay Me Down to Sleep (March 1991)
 When Happily Ever After Ends (February 1992)
 Mourning Song (May 1992)
 Baby Alicia Is Dying (June 1993)
 Don't Die, My Love (August 1995)
 Saving Jessica (May 1996)
 I'll Be Seeing You (July 1996)
 Till Death Do Us Part (July 1997)
 For Better, For Worse, Forever (September 1997)
 The Girl Death Left Behind (May 1999)
 Starry, Starry Night: Three Holiday Stories (October 2000)
 Telling Christina Goodbye (April 2002)
 A Rose For Melinda (August 2002)
 How Do I Love Thee: Three Stories (December 2002)
 Garden of Angels (May 2003)
 The Time Capsule (September 2003)
Till Death Do Us Part and For Better, For Worse, Forever were reissued as a double novel, As Long As We Both Shall Live: Two Novels in October 2003.
 If I Should Die Before I Wake (January 2004)
 A Horse for Mandy (September 2004)
 My Secret Boyfriend (February 2004)
Too Young to Die and Goodbye Doesn't Mean Forever were reissued as a double novel, Always and Forever: Two Novels in May 2004.
Angels of Mercy and Angel of Hope were reissued as a double novel, Journey of Hope: Two Novels (October 2004)
 Sometimes Love Isn't Enough (December 2006)
 Hit and Run (2007)
 Prey (2008)
 All The Days Of Her Life (One Last Wish)
 Sixteen And Dying (One Last Wish)
 Reach for Tomorrow (One Last Wish)
 Breathless (May 2009)
 A Time to Die (One Last Wish)
 Please Don’t Die (One Last Wish)
 Mourning Song (One Last Wish)
 She Died Too Young (One Last Wish)
 Mother, Help Me Live (One Last Wish)
 Someone Dies, Someone Lives (One Last Wish)
 A Season for Goodbye (One Last Wish)
 Let Him Live (One Last Wish)
 The Legacy: Making Wishes Come True (One Last Wish)
 Reaching Through Time: Three Stories

Trilogies
The Angels Trilogy
 Angels Watching Over Me'' (November 1996)
 Lifted Up By Angels (November 1997)
 Until Angels Close My Eyes (August 1998)
Reissued as The Angels Trilogy (October 2002)

The Angels in Pink Trilogy
 Angels in Pink: Kathleen's Story (December 2004)
 Angels in Pink: Raina's Story (May 2005)
 Angels in Pink: Holly's Story (December 2005)

The Mercy / Journey of Hope TrilogyAngel of MercyAngel of HopeQuintets
The Dawn Rochelle Quintet
 Six Months to Live I Want to Live So Much to Live For No Time to CryThese first four novels were combined into an omni titled Dawn Rochelle, Four Novels To Live Again'' (April 2001)

References

External links
Lurlene McDaniel: official website
Lurlene McDaniel: publisher bio site
Official facebook page

1944 births
Living people
American writers of young adult literature
Writers from Philadelphia
American women novelists
Women writers of young adult literature
20th-century American novelists
20th-century American women writers
21st-century American novelists
21st-century American women writers
Novelists from Pennsylvania
University of South Florida alumni